Peter Francis Cassidy (April 8, 1873 – July 9, 1929) was a Major League Baseball first baseman who played for the Louisville Colonels in 1896 and the Brooklyn Superbas and Washington Senators in 1899. He appeared in 101 games in the major leagues over those two seasons.

External links
Baseball Reference stats

1873 births
1929 deaths
Brooklyn Superbas players
Louisville Colonels players
Washington Senators (1891–1899) players
Baseball players from Wilmington, Delaware
Major League Baseball first basemen
19th-century baseball players
Johnstown Buckskins players
Grand Rapids Gold Bugs players
Newark Colts players
Minneapolis Millers (baseball) players
Providence Clamdiggers (baseball) players
Providence Grays (minor league) players
Jersey City Skeeters players
Wilmington Peaches players
Baltimore Orioles (IL) players